An ambush is a military tactic.

Ambush or The Ambush may also refer to:

Music
Ambush (band), Canadian country music band
Ambush (album), by the band Ambush

Film
Ambush (1939 film), directed by Kurt Neumann
Ambush (1950 film), directed by Sam Wood
The Ambush: Incident at Blood Pass, a 1970 Japanese drama film
Ambush (1973 film), originally titled 埋伏
Ambush (1988 film), starring Ronnie Ricketts
Ambush (1999 film), a 1999 Finnish war film
Al Kameen, a 2021 Emirati film released in English as The Ambush

TV episodes
"Ambush" (CSI: Miami)
"Ambush" (ER)
"Ambush" (Star Wars: The Clone Wars)
"The Ambush" (Doctor Who), fourth episode of the 1963–64 serial The Daleks

Ships
HMS Ambush, two Royal Navy submarines
French frigate L'Ambuscade

Other
Ambush (G.I. Joe), a fictional character in the G.I. Joe universe
Ambush!, a board game by Avalon Hill
Ambush (rapper), from London, UK
 AMBUSH, a fashion brand from Korean-American designer Yoon Ahn
Ambush, an entity from the Roblox game doors

See also
 Ambush Bay (Antarctica)
 Ambush predator, an animal that waits for prey to approach instead of actively pursuing